The Stan and Tom Wick Poetry Prize is offered annually to a previously-unpublished poet by the Wick Poetry Center, which is affiliated with Kent State University. Founded by Maggie Anderson and now administered by David Hassler, the prize awards the winner with $2,500 and publication of their first full-length book of poetry by the Kent State University Press. The winner spends a week in residence at the Wick Poetry Center, the 112-year-old home of faculty emeritus May Prentice, giving master classes to university students and community members, culminating in a reading giving together with the competition's judge on the Kent State campus.

Recipients
2022: Sister Tongue by Farnaz Fatemi; Tracy K. Smith, Judge
2021: How Blood Works by Ellene Glenn Moore; Richard Blanco, Judge
2020: On This Side of the Desert by Alfredo Aguilar; Natalie Diaz, judge
2018: Fugue Figure by Michael McKee Green; Khaled Mattawa, judge
2017: Even Years by Christine Gosnay; Angie Estes, judge
2016: hover over her by Leah Poole Osowski; Adrian Matejka, judge
2015: Translation by Matthew Minicucci; Jane Hirshfield, judge
2014: The Spectral Wilderness by Oliver Baez Bendorf; Mark Doty, judge
2013: West by Carolyn Creedon; Edward Hirsch, judge
2012: The Dead Eat Everything by Michael Mlekoday; Dorianne Laux, judge
2011: The Local World by Mira Rosenthal; Maggie Anderson, judge
2010: Visible Heavens by Joanna Solfrian; Naomi Shihab Nye, judge
2009: The Infirmary by Edward Mincus; Stephen Dunn, judge
2008: Far From Algiers by Djelloul Marbook; Toi Derricotte, judge
2007: Constituents of Matter by Anna Leahy; Alberto Rios, judge
2006: Intaglio by Ariana-Sophia Kartsonis; Eleanor Wilner, judge
2005: Trying to Speak by Anele Rubin; Philip Levine, judge
2004: Rooms and Fields by Lee Peterson; Jean Valentine, judge
2003: The Drowned Girl by Eve Alexandra; C.K. Williams, judge
2002: Back Through Interruption by Kate Northrop; Lynn Emanuel, judge
2001: Paper Cathedrals by Morri Creech; Li-Young Lee, judge
2000: The Gospel of Barbeque by Honorée Fanonne Jeffers; Lucille Clifton, judge
1999: Beyond the Velvet Curtain by Karen Kovacik; Henry Taylor, judge
1998: The Apprentice of Fever by Richard Tayson; Marilyn Hacker, judge
1997: Intended Place by Rosemary Willey; Yusef Komunyakaa, judge
1996: Likely by Lisa Coffman; Alicia Suskin Ostriker, judge
1995: Already the World by Victoria Redel; Gerald Stern, judge

External links
First book archive and entry requirements
Wick First Book series, Kent State University Press
Wick Poetry Center on Twitter

References

American poetry awards
Awards established in 1995
Kent State University